The Psychologists League was an organization of politically progressive psychologists that advocated for unemployed and under-employed psychologists during the Great Depression of the 1930s.  Its larger purpose was to bring psychologists into the Marxist-led movement of radicalizing scientists and clinicians.

History 
The League was created in the style of the Popular Front.  A small group of psychologists active in the communist movement called a meeting for January 16, 1935 in the Bellevue Hospital’s psychiatry auditorium.  It drew an audience of 200 psychologists and featured speakers carefully chosen to represent the socialist and communist movements, and a variety of academic and clinical fields.  At the end of the evening, thirty members of the audience volunteered to form an organization combining political activism with reformist pressure within psychology, which would become the Psychologists League. Typical of the Communist Party’s tactics, four communist psychologists emerged as the group’s officers.  Mary Bressler became its Secretary, while its Chairman was Solomon Machover, a former classmate of hers who was a Bellevue co-worker and member of the CP caucus there.  Another Bellevue comrade was Karen Alper (later Karen Machover), a NYU graduate who was put in charge of “Professional Welfare” issues for the League.  They were joined by Solomon Diamond (head of “Programs and Publications”), who became the intellectual leader of the League. Diamond was a young academic researcher who created and led various Popular Front organizations of the CP, writing under the name Albert Magnus.

It soon attracted a wide membership, organizing public discussions and taking part in the annual May Day Parade in New York City.  Beginning in 1937 the League both marched in the parade and used the opportunity for creative propagandizing. League members formed their own contingent with special psycho-political chants and slogans—some improvised on the spot.  Among the most popular were: "Build More Clinics; You'll Need Less Prisons," "Down with Fascism; Up with Science," "Fascism is the World's Worst Behavior Problem," and "Don't be Unconscious; Join Our Ranks.".

As a Marxist group with Communist sympathies, it tried not just to create more employment opportunities for psychologists, but also revolutionizing the methods and intellectual content of psychology.  Typical of Popular Front caucuses in the sciences, the League saw the procedures and results of empirical research as subject to social influence—most notably that of reactionary economic forces.  Sometimes, they believed, this process was blatant, as when eugenicists used poorly standardized intelligence tests to prove that feeblemindedness was the basis for urban ills.  Most often, however, the process was more subtle—as when behaviorists’ research methods excluded political consciousness and social influence from the subject matter of “scientific psychology".  In each case, the League saw its responsibility as fighting reactionary ideology while developing science that would reveal the dialectics of human psychology.

In approaching disputes between different schools of psychological thought, most League members embraced a Marxist eclecticism.  They ridiculed conservative appeals to objectivity and neutrality, criticized elitist assumptions in existing schools of thought, and called for new theories that would stress psychological change and transformation.  The Depression and the rise of fascism demanded united action, these young psychologists believed, rather than jockeying for intellectual and professional advantage.  As League member Goodwin Watson explained at a 1936 forum, narrowly focused disciplines were incapable of dealing with the current social crisis, which he compared to a "sinking ship full of holes and rapidly filling with water."  In Watson's analogy, "sinkologists" absorbed themselves with intensive research on how to repair the ship, while the "sinkiatrists" rushed [in] with all sizes of buckets to scoop the water out, but no solution was reached.  Why not scrap the ship and get a new one? ... A system which rehabilitates in [a therapist's] office and sends the delinquent back to a bad home environment without provision for a job is wasted energy.  We must deal with society directly".

Although the Psychologists League did manage to create some job opportunities for psychologists, especially through the Works Progress Administration, in its more ambitious goals it proved to be less successful. In fact its influence on the policies of the American Psychological Association was largely negligible.

The League also fell victim to the sectarian politics of the Communist Party. When the Communist faction in the League refused to let the organization vote on the Soviet invasion of Finland, the League's president, Dan Harris, resigned.  By 1941, the League became a shell of its former self, existing chiefly as a few dozen members with unshakable faith in the Communist Party's politics.

References

Further reading 
 
 
 
 

Defunct socialist organizations in the United States
Psychology organizations based in the United States
Psychology-related professional associations